Rutland Township is one of sixteen townships in Kane County, Illinois. As of the 2010 census, its population was 18,806 and it contained 8,004 housing units. It was originally called Jackson Township; the name was changed to Rutland on July 2, 1850.

Geography

Cities, towns, villages
 Algonquin (west edge)
 Carpentersville (partial)
 Elgin (partial)
 Gilberts (vast majority)
 Hampshire (east edge)
 Huntley (partial)
 Pingree Grove (vast majority)

Unincorporated towns
 Binnie Hills at 
 Binnie Lakes at 
 Freeman at 
 Starks at 
 The Landings at 
(This list is based on USGS data and may include former settlements.)

Airports and landing strips
 Koppie Airport
 Landings Condominium Airport
 Olivers Heliport
 Reid RLA Airport

Cemeteries
The township contains these two cemeteries: Buena Vista and Saint Mary's Catholic.

Major highways
 Interstate 90
 U.S. Route 20

Demographics

School districts
 Community Unit School District 300
 Huntley Consolidated School District 158

Political districts
 Illinois's 14th congressional district
 State House District 49
 State Senate District 25

References
 
 United States Census Bureau 2009 TIGER/Line Shapefiles
 United States National Atlas

External links
 
 City-Data.com
 Illinois State Archives
 Township Officials of Illinois

1849 establishments in Illinois
Townships in Kane County, Illinois
Townships in Illinois